Amet Yiber Korça (born September 16, 2000) is an American soccer player who plays for Major League Soccer club FC Dallas.

Early life
Korça is from Arlington, Texas where he attended The Oakridge School. He played youth football for Solar SC in North Texas. He joined Dinamo Zagreb in 2019.

Career
Korça joined NK Dubrava from Dinamo Zagreb, initially on loan, before joining permanently and becoming club captain in his final season. When he left the club he bought a new washing machine for his former club as a farewell gift. In June 2022 Korça was announced as a new signing for HNK Gorica, signing a three-year contract. Playing for HNK Gorica in the Croatian Football League he only managed two appearances which included a red card away against HNK Hajduk Split.

In January 2023 he agreed to join FC Dallas, signing a one-year contract with options for 2024 and 2025.

Personal life
Both his parents are Albanian who left Albania initially for New York, before moving to Texas where Korça was born.

References

External links

Living people 
2000 births
American people of Albanian descent
Croatian Football League players
People from Arlington, Texas
American soccer players
FC Dallas players